Brian Wesley Davis (born August 31, 1963) is a former American football cornerback in the National Football League (NFL) for the Washington Redskins, the Seattle Seahawks, the San Diego Chargers, and the Minnesota Vikings. He played college football at the University of Nebraska and was selected in the second round of the 1987 NFL Draft.

With the Redskins in the 1987-88 NFL playoffs, Davis became the last player to tackle Chicago Bears running back Walter Payton, who retired at the end of the season. Later, in Super Bowl XXII, Davis intercepted Denver Broncos quarterback John Elway as the Redskins defeated the Broncos, 42-10.

References

1963 births
Living people
American football cornerbacks
Washington Redskins players
Seattle Seahawks players
San Diego Chargers players
Minnesota Vikings players
Nebraska Cornhuskers football players
Glendale Gauchos football players
Players of American football from Phoenix, Arizona